"Better I Don't" is a song recorded by American country music singer Chris Janson. Janson co-wrote the song with Pat Bunch and Kelly Roland.

Critical reception
Billy Dukes of Taste of Country gave the song a positive review, saying that "Janson’s producer pulls all the elements together for one sweet, smooth ride. The scathing harmonica solo near the bridge almost gets lost upon first listen. So too does the steel guitar that reminds one where Janson’s loyalties lie. It’s a masterful mix that dazzles even before the second verse."

Music video
The music video was directed by Wes Edwards and premiered in March 2013.

Chart performance

References

2013 singles
Bigger Picture Music Group singles
Chris Janson songs
Songs written by Pat Bunch
2013 songs
Song recordings produced by Keith Stegall
Music videos directed by Wes Edwards
Songs written by Chris Janson